Tønnesen Glacier is a broad glacier flowing north between Risemedet Mountain and Festninga Mountain, separating the Gjelsvik Mountains and the Mühlig-Hofmann Mountains in Queen Maud Land. It was mapped by Norwegian cartographers from surveys and air photos by the Norwegian Antarctic Expedition (1956–60) and named for J. Tønnesen, a meteorologist with the expedition.

See also
 List of glaciers in the Antarctic
 Glaciology

References

 

Glaciers of Queen Maud Land
Princess Martha Coast